Woman to Woman is a 1923 British silent drama film directed by Graham Cutts, with Alfred Hitchcock as the uncredited assistant director and co-screenwriter. The film was the first of three adaptions of the 1921 play Woman to Woman by Michael Morton. To capitalise on the success of the film, Cutts and Hitchcock made another film, The White Shadow, with Compson before she returned to the United States.

Hitchcock met his future wife, Alma Reville, while working on this film.

Plot
As described in a film magazine review, Deloryse, a dancer of exquisite charm and grace, is wooed and won by David Compton, an English officer billeted in Paris. On the eve of their marriage, her fiancée is unexpectedly called away. A blow to the head robs him of his memory and he forgets all about the faithful young woman who sacrificed all for him. Later, fate brings them together and, while the man's heart is wrung by the wrong that he has unwittingly done to Deloryse by marrying another woman, Deloryse's one thought is to protect the future of their son. For this, she sacrifices herself by dancing at a fete of the second woman in the case, even after a doctor had warned her that to do so would be fatal.

Cast

Preservation
As of August 2010, the film is missing from the BFI National Archive, and is listed as one of the British Film Institute's "75 Most Wanted" lost films.

See also
 Alfred Hitchcock filmography
 List of lost films

References

External links

BFI 75 Most Wanted entry with extensive notes

1923 films
1923 lost films
1923 romantic drama films
British romantic drama films
British silent feature films
British black-and-white films
Films about amnesia
British films based on plays
Films directed by Graham Cutts
Films set in Paris
Films set in London
Lost British films
Films produced by Victor Saville
Lost romantic drama films
1920s British films
Silent romantic drama films